The French M. Robertson Unit is a maximum-security state prison located on Farm to Market Road 3522 in Abilene, Texas, United States,  northeast of Downtown Abilene in Jones County.

The prison for males, classified as a "prison," is operated by the Correctional Institutions Division of the Texas Department of Criminal Justice, administered as within Region VI.

The Robertson Unit has space for 1,244 inmates in General Population, plus a large Restricted Housing facility. The Unit has a large garment manufacturing facility, which makes garments for several other State and local corrections facilities. Also notable, is the Robertson Unit's kennel of tracking dogs, and horses for mounted operations.

The unit is named after French M. Robertson, a lawyer and oil businessman from Abilene, Texas.

Beginning in September 2010, the prison serves as a regional release unit for prisoners exiting the TDCJ.

History
The unit opened in November 1992.

In 1996 a correctional officer fired a bullet, which he described as a "warning" shot, towards an inmate that he said was running from an outside work squad. The bullet hit the inmate between the eyes, killing him. No outside investigation occurred. The Robertson warden declared the "Officer of the Year" award over, giving it to the officer who shot the prisoner.

On July 16, 2016, Correctional Officer Mari Anne Johnson was beaten to death by an inmate. Her body was found near the kitchen; she had also suffered an injury to the throat. The inmate, Dillion Compton, who was serving time for child rape, was sentenced to death for the murder in 2018.

Notable prisoners

References

External links 

 Robertson Unit, Texas Department of Criminal Justice

Prisons in Texas
Buildings and structures in Abilene, Texas
1992 establishments in Texas